Thomas O'Connor may refer to:

 Thomas O'Connor (bishop) (1755–1803), bishop of Achonry
 Thomas O'Connor (rancher) (1819–1887), Texas cattle rancher and landowner originally from County Wexford, Ireland
 Thomas O'Connor (Wisconsin politician) (1815–1901), American politician and farmer
 Thomas O'Connor (writer) (1770–1855), Irishman who emigrated to New York where he was a journalist
 Tommy O'Connor (died 1987), Irish footballer
 Tommy O'Connor (criminal) (1880–1951), escaped Chicago convict
 Tom O'Connor (American football) (born 1963), American football Punter
 Tom O'Connor (comedian) (1939–2021), English comedian
 Tom O'Connor (priest), local historian
 Thomas Burton O'Connor, American journalist
 Thomas C. O'Connor (1927–2001), mayor of Norwalk, Connecticut, 1982–1983
 Thomas H. O'Connor (1923–2012), Boston historian
 Thomas Martin O'Connor (1913–1998), City Attorney of San Francisco
 T. P. O'Connor (1848–1929), Irish nationalist, journalist, and politician
 Thomas V. O'Connor (1870–1935), Canadian-born American labor union leader
 Thomas O'Connor (footballer) (born 1999), Irish footballer
 Tom O'Connor (Gaelic footballer) (1918–1997), Irish Gaelic footballer
 Thomas J. O'Connor, mayor of Springfield, Massachusetts
 Santa Claus (Alaska politician), born Thomas Patrick O'Connor